Höfle is a Germanic surname.  Notable people with the surname include:

Frank Höfle (born 1967), German Paralympic athlete
Hermann Höfle (1911–1962), Austrian Nazi SS officer and Holocaust perpetrator
Hermann Höfle (SS general) (1898–1947), German Nazi SS general
Heiderose Wallbaum (born 1951), full name Adelhied Wallbaum-Höfle, West German sprint canoer

See also
Höfle Telegram, a document discovered in 2000 which reveals statistical information about the Holocaust

German-language surnames